Motley County Independent School District is a public school district based in Matador, Texas (USA). The district serves all of Motley County with the exception of a small portion in the north, which is served by the Turkey-Quitaque Independent School District. A small portion of northeastern Floyd County lies within the district.

The Motley County Independent School District has one school, Motley County School that serves students in grades pre-kindergarten though twelve.

In 2009, the school district was rated "academically acceptable" by the Texas Education Agency.

References

External links
Motley County ISD

School districts in Motley County, Texas
School districts in Floyd County, Texas